Felicia smaragdina is an annual, bristly and glandular, much branched plant of up to  high, that has been assigned to the family Asteraceae. A unique character is that when dried, the florets become greenish. The species is an endemic species of Namibia.

Description 

These bracts contain resin ducts and have bristles and glandular hairs. The many disc florets have yellow corollas of about 3 mm long. Characteristically, the appendage at the tip of both of the branches of the style is linear in shape. Surrounding the base of the corolla are many white, deciduous pappus bristles of up to about 3 mm (0.14 in) long set with long teeth near their base.

Differences from other species 
Felicia smaragdina is one of only few species of Felicia with yellow ray florets, which in F. smaragdina uniquely turn to a greenish colour when dried. It differs from F. mossamedensis that has a triangular appendage at the tip of the style branches, where F. smaragdina has line-shaped appendages. Compared to F. boehmii, F. smaragdina has lighter florets and narrower leaves that never have teeth.

Taxonomy 
Spencer Le Marchant Moore was the first to describe this species, and he named it Detris smaragdina in 1899, based on a collection made by T.G. Een, in Damaraland, Namibia, in 1879. Moore distinguished a slightly different specimen as Detris smaragdina var. versicolor in 1904, this one based on a collection made by Kurt Dinter in Eromhunga, Namibia. Johannes Mattfeld described a specimen collected by Adolf Engler in 1913 at the old railway line near kilometer marker 114 in Damaraland, and named it Felicia nana. Hermann Merxmüller reassigned Moore's species and made the combination Felicia smaragdina in 1954. Jürke Grau considered all these named synonymous in his 1973 Revision of the genus Felicia.

Distribution 
This species is only known from Namibia.

References

External links 
 line-drawing of Felicia smaragdina
 distribution of Felicia smaragdina

smaragdina
Flora of Namibia
Plants described in 1899